Ahlaam Muhammed, is a Bahraini actress and broadcaster. She is married to fellow actor Abdullah Youssef.

Acting career

Journalism
She served as a radio anchor at Bahrain Radio and Television Corporation, reading news bulletins and emceeing live variety and cultural programs.

Awards
 1997, Best Actress in a Supporting Role, وجوه (“Faces”), Fifth Gulf Cooperation Council Theatre Festival, Kuwait
 2000, Best Actress, ازهار مريم (“Maryam’s Flowers,” a radio series), 26th Cairo Radio and Television Festival
 2001, Certificate of Appreciation, Suspicion Paths, 7th Gulf Radio and Television Festival
 2003, Best Actress, Aweisha, 30th Cairo Radio and Television Festival
 Muharraq Pioneer, Al-Muharraq SC

References

External links
 Filmography at El Cinema

1957 births
Bahraini television actresses
Bahraini stage actresses
Living people